The 31st edition of the Asian Amateur Boxing Championships was held from 24 to 31 May 2021 in Dubai, United Arab Emirates. It was the second time in the tournament's history that men and women fought in the same championship.

Medal summary

Men

Women

Medal table

References

External links
Results

2021
Asian Amateur
International sports competitions hosted by the United Arab Emirates
Asian Amateur Boxing Championships
Sports competitions in Dubai
Asian Amateur Boxing Championships